The RML 6.3-inch howitzer was a British rifled muzzle-loading "siege" or "position" howitzer/mortar proposed in 1874 and finally introduced in 1878 as a lighter version of the successful 8-inch howitzer that could be carried by the existing 40-pounder gun carriage.

By 1880 the RML 6.3-inch was superseded by a longer 6.6-inch howitzer with higher muzzle velocity.

Description

The barrel consisted of an inner "A" tube of toughened mild steel, surrounded by wrought-iron "B" tube and jacket.

Rifling was of the "polygroove" type, with 20 grooves and a twist increasing from 1 turn in 100 calibres (i.e. 630 inches) to 1 in 35 (i.e. 220 inches).

The howitzers could be mounted on either a travelling siege carriage, which enabled them to be semi-mobile, or on a steel bed, which were then positioned in fixed defences or fortifications.

Operational use
Ten 6.3-inch Howitzers were landed in Egypt in 1882 to form part of a Royal Artillery Siege Train during the Anglo-Egyptian War, however they were not used in action. Many were mounted in Forts and batteries around the United Kingdom as part of the fixed defences scheme. Most were dismounted and scrapped after 1902.

A number of RML 6.3-inch howitzers were used by the British forces during the Second Boer War, normally mounted on 40 pr RML carriages.

Ammunition

The 6.3-inch Howitzer used a number of different types of projectiles, depending on the selected target. This included common shell for use against buildings, earthworks or vehicles, or shrapnel shell for use against 'soft' targets, such as infantry or cavalry on open ground. Case shot could be used against soft targets at close range - typically less than 400 yards.

The howitzer used black powder propellant, in silk bags which were ignited by friction tube.

The gun was the first British rifled muzzle-loader to dispense entirely with studs on shells to impart spin : its shells from the beginning had gas checks attached to their base which expanded and engaged with rifling on firing to impart spin to the shell.

Surviving examples 

Two of these guns, called Castor and Pollux, used during the Siege of Ladysmith, stand in front of the Ladysmith town hall. They have been declared Heritage Objects by the South African Heritage Resource Agency. Both the guns and their ammunition were outdated by the time of the siege and they tended to make a lot of smoke when fired.

See also 
List of howitzers

Notes

References 
 Text Book of Gunnery, 1902. LONDON : PRINTED FOR HIS MAJESTY'S STATIONERY OFFICE, BY HARRISON AND SONS, ST. MARTIN'S LANE
Treatise on the Construction and Manufacture of Ordnance in the British Service. War Office, UK, 1879

External links 

 Handbook for the 6.3 inch R. M. L. howitzer on bed and ground platform, or on siege travelling carriage, 1886 at State Library of Victoria
 History of the 6.3-inch RML ordnance

Artillery of the United Kingdom
Howitzers
160 mm artillery